In Greek mythology, the name Iphinoe may refer to:
Iphinoe, an Argive princess as one of the daughters of King Proetus and Stheneboea. She and her sisters Lysippe and Iphianassa were driven mad (either because they didn't accept the rites of Dionysus, or else because they disparaged a wooden statue of Hera) and ran off into the wilderness like maenads. Melampus had to pursue them in order to provide a cure; Iphinoe died in the pursuit, but her sisters did eventually recover their wits through purification rites.
Iphinoe, a Megarian princess as daughter of King Nisos and Abrota of Onchestus, thus sister to Eurynome and Scylla. She was the mother of Timalcus, Evippus and Evaechme by Megareus, her maternal uncle.
Iphinoe, also a Megarian princess as daughter of King Alcathous by either Pyrgo or Evaechme (daughter of the precedent). She died a maiden, and it was a custom for the girls of Megara to bring libations to her tomb and to dedicate a lock of hair to her before their marriage.
Iphinoe, in one version, mother of Daedalus by Metion.
Iphinoe, a Lemnian herald of Hypsipyle, who welcomed the Argonauts upon their arrival at Lemnos.
Iphinoe, the Libyan daughter of Antaeus and Tinjis, mother of Palaemon by Heracles. Otherwise, the mother of Palaemon was called Autonoë, daughter of Pireus.

Notes

References 

 Apollodorus, The Library with an English Translation by Sir James George Frazer, F.B.A., F.R.S. in 2 Volumes, Cambridge, MA, Harvard University Press; London, William Heinemann Ltd. 1921. . Online version at the Perseus Digital Library. Greek text available from the same website.
Apollonius Rhodius, Argonautica translated by Robert Cooper Seaton (1853-1915), R. C. Loeb Classical Library Volume 001. London, William Heinemann Ltd, 1912. Online version at the Topos Text Project.
 Apollonius Rhodius, Argonautica. George W. Mooney. London. Longmans, Green. 1912. Greek text available at the Perseus Digital Library.
 Pausanias, Description of Greece with an English Translation by W.H.S. Jones, Litt.D., and H.A. Ormerod, M.A., in 4 Volumes. Cambridge, MA, Harvard University Press; London, William Heinemann Ltd. 1918. . Online version at the Perseus Digital Library
 Gaius Julius Hyginus, Fabulae from The Myths of Hyginus translated and edited by Mary Grant. University of Kansas Publications in Humanistic Studies. Online version at the Topos Text Project.
 Gaius Valerius Flaccus, Argonautica translated by Mozley, J H. Loeb Classical Library Volume 286. Cambridge, MA, Harvard University Press; London, William Heinemann Ltd. 1928. Online version at theio.com.
 Gaius Valerius Flaccus, Argonauticon. Otto Kramer. Leipzig. Teubner. 1913. Latin text available at the Perseus Digital Library.
Lucius Mestrius Plutarchus, Moralia with an English Translation by Frank Cole Babbitt. Cambridge, MA. Harvard University Press. London. William Heinemann Ltd. 1936. Online version at the Perseus Digital Library. Greek text available from the same website.
Pausanias, Description of Greece with an English Translation by W.H.S. Jones, Litt.D., and H.A. Ormerod, M.A., in 4 Volumes. Cambridge, MA, Harvard University Press; London, William Heinemann Ltd. 1918. . Online version at the Perseus Digital Library
Pausanias, Graeciae Descriptio. 3 vols. Leipzig, Teubner. 1903.  Greek text available at the Perseus Digital Library.

Princesses in Greek mythology
Women of Heracles
Mortal parents of demigods in classical mythology
Attican characters in Greek mythology
Megarian characters in Greek mythology
Mythology of Argos